The CSA Provincial Competitions are three South African domestic cricket competitions run by Cricket South Africa (CSA). Three-day (first-class) and one-day (List A) competitions were introduced for the 2004–05 season, while a Twenty20 competition was introduced for the 2011–12 season.

The CSA competitions are predominantly contested by South African provincial teams, the number of which has been fixed at thirteen since the 2007–08 season. A non-South African team, Namibia, has competed since the 2006–07 season, while two invitational teams from Zimbabwe competed in the early seasons. Prior to the introduction of the CSA competitions, the South African provincial teams competed in the Sunfoil Series (better known as the Currie Cup) and the domestic one-day tournament (known under various names). As part of a reorganisation of South Africa's domestic structure, the provincial teams were replaced in those competitions by six franchise teams, which are wholly professional.

Teams and venues

CSA 3-Day Cup

Name
2004–05: UCB Provincial Cup
2005–06 to 2008–09: South African Airways Provincial Three-Day Challenge
2009–10 to 2013–14: CSA Provincial Three-Day Competition
2014–15 to 2017-18: Sunfoil 3-Day Cup
2018/19 onwards: CSA 3-Day Cup

List of winners

Performance by team
Legend
1st – Champions
2nd – Runners-up
3rd – Third place
underlined – position shared by two teams

CSA One-Day Cup

Name and format
2004–05: UCB Provincial Shield (45 overs)
2005–06 to 2008–09: South African Airways Provincial One-Day Challenge (45 overs)
2009–10: CSA Provincial One-Day Competition (45 overs)
2010–11: CSA Provincial One-Day Competition (40 overs)
2011–12 to 2013–14: CSA Provincial One-Day Competition (50 overs)
2014–15 to 2017–18: CSA Provincial 50 Over Challenge (50 overs)
2018–19 onwards: CSA 1-Day Cup

List of winners

Performance by team
Legend
1st – Champions
2nd – Runners-up
3rd – Third place
SF – Losing semi-finalist (no third-place playoff)

CSA Provincial T20 Cup

Name and format
2011–12 to 2014–15: CSA Provincial T20 (20 overs)
2014–15 to 2015–16: CSA Provincial T20 Challenge (20 overs)
2016–17 to 2018–19: Not contested
2019–20 onwards: CSA Provincial T20 Cup (20 overs)

List of winners

Performance by team
Legend
1st – Champions
2nd – Runners-up
3rd – Third place
SF – Losing semi-finalist (no third-place playoff)

Africa T20 Cup
The Africa T20 Cup was an additional provincial tournament organised by Cricket South Africa. It featured representative teams from other African countries, including Kenya, Namibia, Nigeria, Uganda and Zimbabwe in addition to the South African provincial sides. The Africa T20 was first held in September to October 2015 at the start of the South African season, and was followed by the CSA Provincial T20 Challenge later in the year. From the 2015–16 season, the CSA Challenge League was not played, leaving the Africa T20 Cup as the only provincial level T20 tournament in the country. It ran for four editions before being scrapped, with the CSA Provincial T20 Cup returning and taking over as the only provincial T20 tournament.

List of winners

See also
 CSA Women's Provincial Programme
 CSA Women's Provincial T20 Competition

Notes

References

South African domestic cricket competitions
Namibia in international cricket
Zimbabwe in international cricket
List A cricket competitions